The Wisconsin circuit courts were established by the Constitution of Wisconsin, ratified by referendum May 8, 1848.  There were originally five circuit courts—each with one judge.  In the first version of the constitution, and, until 1853, the circuit court judges also served as the Wisconsin Supreme Court.  The number of courts was expanded via legislation as the population of the state grew.  There are currently 69 circuit courts in the state with 249 current judges.  The circuit courts are organized into nine judicial administrative districts.

On March 6, 2020, Governor Tony Evers signed bipartisan legislation to create 12 new circuit court branches to be elected in spring 2021 and take office in fall 2021.

The current system was implemented by a 1977 act of the Wisconsin Legislature (1977 Wisconsin Act 187), authorized by an April 1977 referendum to amend the state constitution.  The act combined the pre-1978 County Courts with the pre-1978 Circuit Courts to create a single level of trial courts—the present Wisconsin Circuit Courts.  The act also created the Wisconsin Court of Appeals.

Chief Judges (1978–Present)

Judicial Districts (1978–Present)

District 1 Judges

District 2 Judges

District 3 Judges

District 4 Judges

District 5 Judges

District 6 Judges (abolished 2018)

District 7 Judges

District 8 Judges

District 9 Judges

District 10 Judges

Numbered Circuits (1848–1978)

1st Circuit (1848)

2nd Circuit (1848)

3rd Circuit (1848)

4th Circuit (1848)

5th Circuit (1848)

6th Circuit (1850)

7th Circuit (1854)

8th Circuit (1855)

9th Circuit (1855)

10th Circuit (1855)

11th Circuit (1864)

12th Circuit (1871)

13th Circuit (1877)

14th Circuit (1884)

15th Circuit (1888)

16th Circuit (1891)

17th Circuit (1891)

18th through 26th Circuits (1900–1978)

Sources

References

Lists of American judges
Wisconsin state courts